The Hotel Charlotte, also known as Hotel Charlotte & Cafe or Hotel Charlotte & Restaurant, is a hotel opened in 1921 in Groveland, California. It was listed on the National Register of Historic Places in 1994.

Charlotte DeFerrari, the hotel's namesake and builder, was born in Genoa, Italy in 1881. Her family migrated to the California gold fields when DeFerrari was sixteen. During this era, the Groveland area went from boom to bust and back again. The gold rush and then the San Francisco Hetch-Hetchy water project brought prosperity and notoriety to the Groveland and Big Oak Flat settlements.

Shortly after arriving in Groveland, DeFerrari's father was killed in a mining accident at Hardin Flat, and young DeFerrari took it upon herself to support and hold the family together. She began cooking for work crews, ranch hands and several local settlers. She then opened a restaurant in the building that is now the Iron Door Saloon, claimed by its proprietors to be the oldest continuously operating saloon in California.

In 1918, DeFerrari built the hotel on the site of an old livery stable, and in 1921 she purchased the Gem Saloon next door, annexing it to the Hotel Charlotte as a restaurant.

References

External links 
 

Hotel buildings on the National Register of Historic Places in California
Buildings and structures in Tuolumne County, California
National Register of Historic Places in Tuolumne County, California